Jacques Gamblin is a French actor.

Life and career 
Jacques Gamblin is a French actor. He studied at the Centre dramatique de Caen (Caen Dramatic Arts Centre).

Originally, Jacques Gamblin was not destined to act. As a professional technician in a theater company, he came to contact with acting. He then studied at the Comédie de Caen and took his first steps as an actor on stage in Brittany, Totem Theatre in Saint-Brieuc, before joining the National Theatre, directed by Pierre de Rennes Debauche. Then he tried his luck in Paris, carefully choosing his roles and he made his film debut in 1985.

In theatre, Jacques Gamblin worked with many directors such as Pierre Claude Yersin, Michel Dubois, Jeanne Champagne, Philippe Adrien, Alfredo Arias, Charles Tordjman, Jean-Louis Martinelli, Gildas Bourdet, and Anne Bourgeois.

He is also the author of plays such as The Touch Hardware and hip (1997).

Theater

Filmography

External links

1957 births
Living people
People from Manche
French male film actors
French male stage actors
20th-century French male actors
21st-century French male actors
Silver Bear for Best Actor winners